Helene Ferris is the first second-career female rabbi in Judaism.

Biography
Helene Ferris was ordained by the Reform Jewish seminary Hebrew Union College-Jewish Institute of Religion in 1981, and worked as an associate rabbi for Stephen Wise Free Synagogue in New York from 1981 until 1991 when she felt she had reached the limits of her work there.
From 1991 until her retirement in 2006, Ferris was the chief rabbi at Temple Israel of Northern Westchester, a Reform synagogue in Croton-on-Hudson, New York.

Among her most well-known activities, on December 1, 1988, Ferris helped prepare a prayer service and read from the Torah at the Western Wall, along with over 70 other Jewish women. This was the first time in history Jewish women prayed together and read from the Torah together at the Western Wall. Ferris is a board member of the International Committee for Women of the Wall (ICWOW), which is a group working to give women the right to lead public prayers at the Western Wall, which is now illegal.

Ferris supports the inclusion of lesbian and gay Jews in religious life. In 1986, she organized a conference on lesbian and gay Jews in New York City. In 1989 she presided over a same-sex wedding ceremony for Ileen Kaufman and Jan Catalfumo; few rabbis would officiate such a ceremony in those days.

In 2007, Letty Cottin Pogrebin chose her as one of "The Other Fifty Top Rabbis in America." She has written for Reform Judaism magazine.

See also
Timeline of women rabbis

References

External links
 

Living people
American Reform rabbis
Reform women rabbis
People from Croton-on-Hudson, New York
Year of birth missing (living people)
21st-century American Jews